Lologonitel is a rural locality (a selo) in Akhvakhsky District, Republic of Dagestan, Russia. The population was 1,457 as of 2010.

Geography 
Lologonitel is located on the Izanitlar River, 14 km south of Karata (the district's administrative centre) by road. Tad-Magitl is the nearest rural locality.

References 

Rural localities in Akhvakhsky District